The 2015–16 Northern Illinois Huskies men's basketball team represented Northern Illinois University during the 2015–16 NCAA Division I men's basketball season. The Huskies, led by fifth year head coach Mark Montgomery, played their home games at the Convocation Center as members of the West Division of the Mid-American Conference. They finished the season 21–13, 9–9 in MAC play to finish in a tie for third place in the West Division. They defeated Western Michigan in the first round of the MAC tournament to advance to the quarterfinals where they lost to Ohio. They were invited to the inaugural Vegas 16, which only had eight teams, where they lost in the quarterfinals to UC Santa Barbara.

Previous season
The Huskies finished the season 14–16, 8–10 in MAC play to finish in a tie for fourth place in the West Division. They lost in the first round of the MAC tournament to Akron.

Departures

Incoming Transfers

Recruiting class of 2015

Recruiting class of 2016

Roster

Schedule

|-
!colspan=9 style="background:#000000; color:#C41E3A;"| Non-conference regular season

|-
!colspan=9 style="background:#000000; color:#C41E3A;" | MAC Regular season

|-
!colspan=9 style="background:#000000; color:#C41E3A;" | MAC tournament

|-
!colspan=9 style="background:#000000; color:#C41E3A;" | Vegas 16

References

Northern Illinois
Northern Illinois Huskies men's basketball seasons
Northern Illinois
Northern
Northern